There are various modes of transport available in Warrington.

Rail
Warrington has seven railway stations within its boundaries. The town has two main railway stations, Bank Quay on the London to Glasgow and Chester – Warrington – Newton-le-Willows – Manchester lines, and Central on the Liverpool – Widnes – Manchester line and the Transpennine route. Bank Quay is much altered, but Central (built 1873) is of some architectural merit, featuring polychromatic brickwork. However, both main railway stations have suffered from years of under investment. A new entrance and concourse has been built at Bank Quay, and similar work started in July 2010 at Central station. There are also stations in the suburbs at Warrington West, Sankey, Glazebrook, Padgate and Birchwood.

Routes through Bank Quay

Warrington Bank Quay, to the south-west of Warrington's town centre, is between Crewe and Preston on the West Coast Main Line from London Euston and Birmingham New Street to Glasgow and Edinburgh, with services operated by Avanti West Coast. There are also regional trains from Manchester to Chester and North Wales, from Chester to Leeds, and to Liverpool with one daily service to Ellesmere Port. Arpley and Walton Sidings nearby are a major rail freight interchange, and connect the main line to the freight line to Ditton Junction, which served Fiddlers Ferry Power Station until its closure, crossing the main line under Bank Quay station, where there were once low level platforms.

Routes through Central

Central station has local services to Liverpool and Manchester and express services from Liverpool to Manchester then to Sheffield and beyond.

The trains departing Central serve the urban-rural fringe of Warrington and Manchester, serving Birchwood, Padgate, Irlam etc. before heading into Manchester. To the west, some trains serve Warrington West Station before heading into Merseyside and Liverpool. Beyond Manchester, the hourly East Midlands Railway train serves Manchester and then heads to Sheffield, Nottingham and Norwich.

The station has an average daytime frequency of four trains per hour (three local trains operated by Northern and one fast train to Norwich (East Midlands Railway).

History
The first railway to reach Warrington was the Warrington and Newton Railway in 1831, which connected to the Liverpool and Manchester Railway. Later, the Grand Junction Railway provided a connection to Birmingham and thence to London.

By 1900 the local rail network was complete, with the London and North Western Railway having 3 routes

 North to South (Carlisle-Preston-Warrington Bank Quay-Crewe-London)
 East to West (Manchester-Warrington Bank Quay (low level)-Ditton Junction-Liverpool
 Warrington Bank Quay to Chester and North Wales

and the Cheshire Lines Committee having one route from Liverpool Central via Warrington Central to Manchester Central. There was also a line avoiding Warrington Central (closed in 1968).

The Warrington Bank Quay low level route was closed to regular passenger traffic in 1962. Occasional freight services continue on the Ditton Junction-Warrington section but the line east towards Manchester has been closed and converted into the Trans-Pennine Trail.

Former stations in the Warrington area include

closed 1949 – Sankey Bridges
1950 – Fidler's Ferry and Penketh
1954 – Warrington Arpley
1962 – Heatley and Warburton, Lymm, Latchford, Thelwall

Buses
The town and its districts are fairly well served by bus services. Warrington's Own Buses is the main provider of services, operating most of the day time bus routes. Arriva North West, First Greater Manchester.
National Express also operate their long-distance services through Warrington. Most services that serve Warrington depart from and arrive at Warrington Interchange. However services can be caught from various points around the town centre, principally Rylands Street (for South and Eastbound routes), Academy Way (Inbound and Eastbound routes), Warrington Central for Northbound services, Sankey Street for Westbound, Eastbound and Southbound buses.

Roads
There are three key motorways serving the town and surrounding areas. The town is located roughly halfway between Liverpool and Manchester.

The M6 has four junctions in Warrington. Junction 20 serves the rural south-eastern outskirts of Warrington (i.e. Lymm, Grappenhall, Appleton Thorn and Hatton), it also acts as the "Lymm Interchange" for the M56. Junction 21 serves Woolston, Padgate, Birchwood and the town centre. Junction 21A is the "Croft Interchange" for the M62. Finally, junction 22 serves the north-eastern rural suburbs (i.e. Kenyon, Croft, and Culcheth). To the North, the next exit is for Haydock, to the south the next exit is for Macclesfield, Knutsford and Northwich.

The M62 also has four junctions serving Warrington. Junction 11 serves the Eastern suburbs (Birchwood, Risley, and Culcheth). Junction 10 is known as the "Croft Interchange" and links to the M6. Junction 9 serves the town centre, and inner city areas (Orford, Winwick, and Longford). Finally, junction 8 serves the western suburbs (Westbrook, Sankey and Callands). To the west, the next junction serves St. Helens, Prescot, and Widnes. Towards the east, the next junction is known as the "Eccles Interchange", linking the M60.

The third motorway skirts the south-east of Warrington, the M56 interchanges with the M6 at junction 9. Junction 10 serves the very rural outskirts of Warrington (Stretton and Hatton).

There are several A-roads serving Warrington:
A49 (Ross-on-Wye-Preston)
A56 (Chester-Skipton)
A57 (Liverpool-Lincoln)
A562 (Liverpool-Sankey)
A572 (St. Helens-Swinton)
A574 (Sankey-Leigh)
A579(Winwick-Ainsworth)
A5088
A6144

River
The River Mersey runs through the heart of the town dividing it into two.  There are only two main thoroughfares crossing the Mersey in Warrington: at Bridgefoot and at the Kingsway Bridge. Another crossing is planned from Lower Walton to Arpley.

Canals
Warrington is also divided by the Manchester Ship Canal but there are three swing bridges and a high-level cantilever bridge providing crossing points, and another high-level crossing is planned between Warrington and Runcorn.

The picturesque Bridgewater Canal runs through the Borough from the scenic village of Lymm to Walton Lea Gardens, a local park/leisure area.

The first modern canal is also located in Warrington.  The Sankey Canal starts at Spike Island in Widnes, going through Sankey Valley Park past Bewsey Old Hall & Gullivers World theme park, on through Earlestown and ending at the old Safeway store (now Tesco) in St. Helens.

Air
Although Warrington itself does not have an airport, it is within half an hour (by road) of two international airports : Liverpool John Lennon Airport and Manchester Airport, each with a mix of various international, European, domestic and regional flights. You can reach Manchester Airport by train (via Piccadilly Station in Manchester).

At one point Warrington was home to a world-famous military airfield used intensively during World War Two at Burtonwood.  Now the runway is part of the M62 and the area has now been transformed into Gemini business park.  When driving down the M62 one can still see some of the old aircraft hangars that are now home to various businesses.

Cycling

Warrington is home to the Warrington Cycle Campaign, a cycling advocacy group that has received international attention with its 'Cycle facility of the month' feature.

External links
Network Warrington
Arriva
Fairbrothers of Warrington
Halton Transport
First Group
Warrington Metro Map
National Rail
RAF Burtonwood Association
Sankey Canal Restoration Society (SCARS)

References 

 
Transport in Cheshire